Claudia Andujar (born June 12, 1931) is a Swiss-born Brazilian photographer and activist. Andujar co-founded the Comissão Pró-Yanomami (CCPY), an advocacy organization that supports the rights of the Yanomami people.

Early life and education 
The daughter of a Hungarian Jewish father and a Swiss mother, she was born Claudine Haas in Neuchâtel, Switzerland. She grew up in the city of Oradea, which changed hands between the kingdoms of Hungary and Romania. Towards the end of World War II, she and her mother took refuge in Switzerland. Her father died in the Dachau concentration camp, and the rest of her father's family died either at Dachau or Auschwitz.

She studied humanities at Hunter College in New York City. There she met a Spanish refugee, Julio Andujar, whom she married in 1949 and whose last name she still maintains. Andujar moved to Brazil in 1956 to stay with her mother, Germaine Guye Haas.

Career 
A project on the Karajá people in central Brazil led her to a career in photojournalism. Her work has appeared in various magazines, including Life, Look, Fortune, Aperture, Realidade and Claudia.

She has documented the culture of the Yanomami people over the years, including a book Yanomami: The House, The Forest, The Invisible published in 1998. The Yanomami had had little contact with the outside world. When a highway project through their territory led to a disastrous outbreak of measles, she suspended her photographic work to help bring medical aid to them. 

In 1977, Brazil's military regime expelled her from the region after she denounced the appropriation of indigenous lands by settlers. During the 1980s, an influx of illegal gold miners into this region led to more health problems, including an outbreak of malaria and mercury poisoning. Twenty per cent of the Yanomami population died as a result. Andujar played an important role in establishing the Commission for the Creation of the Yanomami Park which led to the Brazilian government establishing a 96,000 km2 protected area for use by the Yanomami.

Her work was supported by Guggenheim Fellowships in 1971 and 1977. Andujar's photographs are included in the collections of various museums, including the Museum of Modern Art in New York City and the Eastman House in Rochester, New York. A gallery of the Inhotim museum in Brumadinho was built to display her work.

Reccognition 
Andujar received a Cultural Freedom Prize in 2000 for her work in portraying and aiding the Yanomani people. In 2008, she was named to the Brazilian Ordem do Mérito Cultural. In 2018, she received a Goethe Medal for her groundbreaking work with the Yanomami.

References

Further reading

External links 
Claudia Andujar at Museum of Modern Art. 
 Gerhard Bissell, Andujar, Claudia, in: Allgemeines Künstlerlexikon (Artists of the World), Suppl. I, Saur, Munich 2005, from p. 349 (in German).

1931 births
Living people
Brazilian photographers
Brazilian women photographers
Hunter College alumni
Brazilian activists
Brazilian people of Hungarian-Jewish descent
Swiss people of Hungarian descent
Swiss people of Jewish descent
Swiss emigrants to Brazil